Kakarlamudi is a village in the Bapatla district of the Indian state of Andhra Pradesh. It is located in Vemuru mandal of Tenali revenue division.

Geography

Governance 

Kakarlamudi gram panchayat is the local self-government of the village. The gram panchayat was awarded Nirmala Grama Puraskaram for the year 2013.

References

External links

Villages in Guntur district